Armadale and Blackridge is one of the nine wards used to elect members of the West Lothian Council. It elects three Councillors.

Councillors

Election results

2022 Election
2022 West Lothian Council election

2017 election
2017 West Lothian Council election

2012 election
2012 West Lothian Council election

2007 election
2007 West Lothian Council election

References

Wards of West Lothian
Armadale, West Lothian